Like Nirvana is the fourth studio album by Australian pop group Cub Sport. The album was announced on 4 March 2020, alongside the album's lead single "Confessions". The album was due for release 8 May 2020, but was delayed until 24 July 2020.

In an open letter to The Music, Cub Sport's Tim Nelson said Like Nirvana, is an uplifting release that doesn't shy away from the shadows, "it embraces both the light and dark with warmth."

Critical reception

Annabel Ross of NME praised the album as "their most stunning LP yet" and stated: "stadium-sized glory might be painfully out of reach right now, for reasons beyond their control – but on 'Like Nirvana', Cub Sport make a compelling case for post-pandemic superstardom." Ross additionally stated "[the chorus of] "Confessions" channels Kanye West and Frank Ocean", and "is the first of many instances where vocal effects lend modern, raw tones to the record's ecclesiastical mood."

Guido Farnell of The Music AU said "This album captures some of Tim Nelson's most vulnerable moments. Elegantly understated and, for the most part, supremely chill, Cub Sport have stripped back the synth-pop hooks to create mellow clouds of sound intended to provide a little comfort and succour."

Poppy Reid of Rolling Stone Australia said "Cub Sport's defining aesthetic is their ability to confound categorisation. A horde of hopefuls will find solace within Like Nirvana, yet the hopeless will feel heard, and lovers of pop will obsess over its hooks and eighties reinvention." Reid said the highlights are "Confessions", "Be Your Man", "Grand Canyon" and "Break Me Down".

Eleanor Pettipher of Fortitude Magazine gave the album 10/10 saying "Like Nirvana feels like a giant leap away from the Cub Sport of This Is Our Vice (2016) and Bats (2017), not to say that they've lost what makes them them, only they've honed it further and carved out their own undoubted niche. Tim Nelson came out publicly as gay in 2017 and this album above all others has become the platform for Cub Sport to express their LGBTQ+ pride and spread the themes of self-love and acceptance." Pettipher added "If 2020 needs anything right now it's Like Nirvana so we can transcend out of the fog and into the rays of the sun."

Emily Harrison from The Up Coming said "Deep and abstract, Like Nirvana is a glimpse into Nelson's soul in a way that makes you feel both deeply empathetic and empowered." calling it "an album for this generation."

Track listing

Charts

Release history

References

2020 albums
Albums postponed due to the COVID-19 pandemic
Cub Sport albums
Self-released albums